The Tennessee Open Records Act is a law that states that any citizen of Tennessee may request public records there.  Public documents shall "be open for personal inspection by any citizen of Tennessee."  However, recent federal court rulings have overturned similar state specific statutes and open up records in these states to all U.S. citizens. 

In a US Supreme Court ruling McBurney v. Young (2013), concerning Virginia specifically but also relevant to Tennessee, upheld that states can restrict open records to their citizens. However open records counsel Ann V. Butterworth also stated that the law "does not forbid providing access to others".

References

External links
 

Tennessee
Tennessee law